Nasirul Alam (born 5 September 1977) is a Bangladeshi first-class cricketer who played for Sylhet Division.

References

External links
 

1977 births
Living people
Bangladeshi cricketers
Sylhet Division cricketers
People from Sylhet